Milorad Janjuš (Serbian Cyrillic: Милорад Јањуш; born 15 July 1982) is a Serbian footballer who plays as a striker.

Club career

Early career
Janjuš started his professional career at FK Novi Sad from 2007. In 2008, he left on loan to FK Spartak Zlatibor Voda. As part of the agreement, FK Spartak Zlatibor Voda have an option to sign him permanently at the end of the season 2010.

FK Spartak Zlatibor Voda
After impressive season with FK Novi Sad, Janjuš transferred to Zlatibor Voda for 2009–2010 season. He scored first goal for the club on 5 December 2009, against FK Smederevo. After the 2009–2010 season finished, he joined Pakhtakor FK on loan.

Pakhtakor Tashkent
In February 2010, Janjuš joined Uzbek League club Pakhtakor Tashkent FK on loan for an initial short period of month, which also under a contract of FK Spartak Zlatibor Voda. He made 3 appearances for the club, and returned to Zlatibor Voda on May when his contract expired.

Sepahan FC
From season 2010–2012, Milorad Janjuš joined Iranian Sepahan FC. Janjuš won the Iran Professional League (IPL) title with Sepahan last season but fell out of favor with coach Zlatko Kranjčar in the current season. He made 36 appearances with scoring 11 goals in Iranian Pro League championship and getting more chance playing in AFC Champions League. After the 2012 season finished, he left the club moved to Shahrdari Tabriz FC.

Shahrdari Tabriz
On 5 January 2012, it was announced by Shahrdari Tabriz FC that the club had reached an agreement with Sepahan FC and Milorad Janjuš for his transfer, a deal was made him reunited with his former coach Amir Ghalenoei to join the club.

SHB Đà Nẵng F.C
In January 2013, Milorad Janjuš joined Vietnamese side SHB Đà Nẵng F.C on a one-year deal. He made his debut for SHB Đà Nẵng F.C against Kienlongbank Kiên Giang F.C. in the V League. Milorad Janjuš made nine further appearances with three goals for SHB Đà Nẵng F.C, both in V League, as the club won the Vietnamese Super Cup.

Sarawak FA
In December 2013, Janjuš have been trialed with Sarawak FA to fill foreign player quota after Sarawak already signed Iranian Alireza Abbasfard and Hungarian Gábor Gyepes who has previously played for Cardiff City. He made his debut for Sarawak on 18 January 2014 against ATM FA, however Sarawak defeated 2–0 to ATM in the first game of Malaysia Super League.  On his FA Cup debut, he scored first goals against Penang FA that bringings Sarawak into Malaysia FA Cup second round.

Honours

Club
 Sepahan F.C.
Iran Pro League: 2010–2011

 SHB Đà Nẵng F.C
Vietnam Super League : Runner-up 2013 V.League 1
Vietnamese Super Cup : 2013
Vietnamese National Cup : Runner-up 2013 Vietnamese National Cup

References

Living people
1982 births
Footballers from Novi Sad
Serbian footballers
Serbian expatriate footballers
RFK Novi Sad 1921 players
FK Spartak Subotica players
Sepahan S.C. footballers
Serbian SuperLiga players
Pakhtakor Tashkent FK players
Expatriate footballers in Iran
Expatriate footballers in Uzbekistan
Serbian expatriate sportspeople in Iran
Serbian expatriate sportspeople in Uzbekistan
FK Proleter Novi Sad players
Association football forwards